Nicomedes Santa Cruz Gamarra (June 4, 1925 – February 5, 1992) was a Peruvian singer, songwriter and musicologist. He was primarily a decimista (or decimero), a singer of décimas. He researched most forms of Afro-Peruvian music and dance, becoming the leading ethnomusicologist in Peru.

Biography

Santa Cruz was born in La Victoria District, Lima, Peru, to Nicomedes Santa Cruz Aparicio and Victoria Gamarra Ramírez, and was the ninth of ten siblings. After his schooling, it was decided that he would work as a blacksmith, which he did until 1956 when he left his workshop and traveled throughout Peru and Latin America, composing and reciting his poems. In 1945, he met Don Porfirio Vasquez (father of the singer Pepe Vazquez), who became a decisive influence on Santa Cruz's development as a decimero, a composer using the décima form. Porfirio Vasquez came to Lima in 1920 and was an early pioneer of the movement to regain the lost cultural identity of Afro-Peruvians.

Santa Cruz assumed the task of reviving Afro-Peruvian folklore through a theater company he organized with his sister Victoria Santa Cruz (1959–1961), through radio broadcasts, and through his collaborations in the daily newspapers Expreso and El Comercio as well as other publications. In 1959, with his group Conjunto Cumanana, he recorded the album Kumanana, followed in 1960 by Ingá and Décimas y poemas Afroperuanos. In 1964 he recorded a four-album set, Cumanana. In 1967 he attended the Canción Protesta Encuentro in Cuba, and recorded his poem "Benny 'Kid' Paret, which was issued on the album Canción Protesta.

He made his theater debut in 1957 at the Teatro Municipal de Chile, with the company Pancho Fierro, in a show called Black Rhythms of Peru. He also ventured into journalism, radio, and television. During his travels, he continued to participate in events promoting Afro-Peruvian folklore, notably his address at the first Black Arts Festival, held in Cañete, in August 1971. In 1974 he traveled for the first time to Africa, where in Dakar, Senegal, he participated in the symposium "Négritude et Amérique Latine" with his lecture "Aportes de las civilizaciones africanas al folklore del Peru". That same year he traveled to Cuba and México, participating in a series of television programs, as well as later trips to Japan (1976), Colombia (1978), Cuba, Canción Protesta Encuentro (1967), Cuba (1979), Panama (1980).

In 1980 he moved to Madrid, where he lived until his death, working as a journalist at Radio Exterior de España. In 1987 he began collaborating in preparing a series of LP record albums called Espana en su Folklore, a collection of songbooks from Spain and America. In 1989 he taught a seminar on African culture in Santo Domingo (Dominican Republic) and the following year participated in the expedition Adventure 92, touring ports in Mexico and Central America.

He died of lung cancer on February 5, 1992, after surgery at the Clinical Hospital in Madrid.

Legacy
June 4, the birthday of Nicomedes Santa Cruz, has since 2006 been celebrated as a Day of Afro-Peruvian Culture.

In 2010 the Peruvian hip-hop group Comité Pokoflo released a tribute song, "Tributo a Nicomedes", in their mixtape El Grito.

Discography
Gente Morena (1957)
Nicomedes Santa Cruz y Su Conjunto Kumanana (1959)
Ingá (1960)
Décimas y Poemas (1960)
Cumanana. Poemas y canciones (1964)
Cumanana. Antología afroperuana (1965, 1970)
Octubre mes morado (1964)
Canto negro (1968)
América negra (1972)
Nicomedes en Argentina (1973)
Socabón. Introducción al folclor musical y danzario de la costa peruana (1975)
España en su folclor (1987)

Written works
Décimas (1959, 1960, 1966)
Cumanana (1960)
Canto a mi Perú (1966)
Décimas y poemas: antología (1971)
Ritmos negros del Perú (Buenos Aires, 1973)
Rimactampu; rimas al Rímac (1972)
La décima en el Perú (Lima, 1982)
Como has cambiado pelona (Chincha, 1959)
De ser como soy me alegro
Acocachos Aprendí: La escuelita (1958)

References

External links
Nicomedes Santa Cruz website.

Peruvian singer-songwriters
1925 births
1992 deaths
Singers from Lima
Peruvian ethnomusicologists
Male singer-songwriters
20th-century Peruvian male singers
20th-century Peruvian singers
20th-century musicologists